Kadenang Ginto (/) is a 2018 Philippine drama television series starring Francine Diaz, Andrea Brillantes, Beauty Gonzalez, Albert Martinez, Dimples Romana, Adrian Alandy and Richard Yap. The series premiered on ABS-CBN's Kapamilya Gold afternoon block and worldwide via The Filipino Channel from October 8, 2018 to February 7, 2020, replacing Asintado.

Series overview

Episodes

Season 1 (2018–19)

Season 2 (2019)

Season 3 (2019–20)

References

Lists of Philippine drama television series episodes